Abertillery railway station was a station which served Abertillery, in the Welsh county of Monmouthshire.

History
The line was converted to a railway in 1855 together with other Monmouth tramroads in the area. It became part of the Great Western Railway in 1880 and remained there at the Grouping of 1923.

Solidly-built stone buildings were provided on the Up platform. The platforms were constructed of timber in order to reduce the weight on the made-up land on the valley side. Just to the south of the station was Abertillery Junction where a short mineral branch less than a mile long diverged to serve Cwmtillery Colliery from 1858 to 1963. The station had 59 employees in 1929 and 48 in 1938. In the 1930s, a combined rail and theatre ticket was issued which allowed passengers from certain stations in the Western valleys of Monmouthshire to travel to Abertillery which at the time had four cinemas.

Passenger services were withdrawn from the station on 30 April 1962 and cessation of goods services followed on 7 April 1969. The line through the station was singled on 3 May 1971. The route was progressively shortened as collieries were closed, with the last section being taken out of use in 1989 after the closure of Six Bells Colliery. The first station had remained open for goods traffic until 1 April 1963 during which period it was designated as "Abertillery Old Yard".

Present and future

The trackbed is clear up to south of the former station site. However the A467 road has been built on the formation from there northward.

The platform of the old station, albeit entirely cleared of station buildings, remained partly in place into the 1980s until the A467 development began, but a wire fence stood between it and the singled line. Station House, the one-time home of the stationmaster and the one remaining building associated with Abertillery Station, remains as a private dwelling on the town's Oak Street.

Proposed reopening

Abertillery was initially identified as a potential future phase development of the Ebbw Valley Railway. The preferred location of the station would be the British Gas site to the south of the former Co-op store. The extension of the railway line to Abertillery would involve relaying  of single-track from Aberbeeg Junction.

Negotiations were said to be ongoing with Tesco, the owners of the Co-op site, for the sale of the land. The site would have parking for up to 80 cars, creating a park and ride facility. The estimated cost of extending the line to Abertillery is estimated at £16.7m according to Sewta; part of the trackbed, which is owned by Blaenau Gwent Council, is used as a cycleway but there is thought to be sufficient space for a single track.

However, after the scheme was omitted from the Welsh Government's National Transport Plan for funding priorities until 2015, Welsh Transport Minister Carl Sargeant AM confirmed that the new station is not a priority until after 2015.

This line has been identified by Campaign for a Better Transport as a priority 1 candidate for reopening.

References

Notes

Sources

External links
Archive of Ebbw Valley Railway Scheme website (Blaenau Gwent council, 2008)
Station on navigable O.S. map
Pictures of the old station

Disused railway stations in Blaenau Gwent
History of Monmouthshire
Proposed railway stations in Wales
Former Great Western Railway stations
Railway stations in Great Britain opened in 1850
Railway stations in Great Britain closed in 1962
1850 establishments in Wales
1969 disestablishments in Wales
Abertillery